Sherone Simpson (born 12 August 1984) is a Jamaican track and field sprint athlete. She is a gold medalist in the 4 × 100 m relay from the 2004 Olympics and silver medalist in 2005 World Championships and now is the silver medalist in the individual event at the 2008 Summer Olympics, after she tied for second with Kerron Stewart in a photo finish.

On 14 July 2013, Simpson announced that she had tested positive for the drug oxilofrine. In April 2014, the Jamaica Anti-Doping Commission announced that she would be suspended for 18 months over doping charges, expiring in December that year. However, after appealing to the Court of Arbitration for Sport (CAS), the suspension was lifted on 14 July 2014.

Biography
With her personal best of 10.82 seconds in the 100 m, Simpson is ranked 7th among Jamaican women, behind Elaine Thompson-Herah (10.54), Shelly-Ann Fraser-Pryce (10.60),  Merlene Ottey (10.74), Kerron Stewart (10.75), Veronica Campbell Brown (10.76) and Shericka Jackson (10.76). Simpson's 200 m personal best of 22.00 seconds ranks her 9th among Jamaican women behind Elaine Thompson-Herah, Merlene Ottey, Grace Jackson, Veronica Campbell-Brown, Juliet Cuthbert, Shelly-Ann Fraser-Pryce, Shericka Jackson and Kerron Stewart. She has run this time on two occasions. Simpson is coached by Stephen Francis in Kingston, Jamaica, where she attends the University of Technology. She is also a graduate of Manchester High.

Simpson won the gold medal in the women's 200 m at the 2006 Commonwealth Games, beating Olympic champion Veronica Campbell and completing a Jamaican sweep of 100–200 m gold medals. Jamaica also won both sprint hurdles gold medals.

At the 2008 Summer Olympics in Beijing she competed at the 100 m sprint. In her first round heat she placed third behind Yevgeniya Polyakova and Jade Bailey in a time of 11.48 to advance to the second round. There she improved her time to 11.02 seconds to win her heat in front of Muna Lee and Chandra Sturrup. With 11.11 seconds in her semi final race she placed fourth and earned her spot in the Olympic final. In a remarkable race with fellow Jamaican Shelly-Ann Fraser taking the gold, Simpson and Kerron Stewart both finished in 10.98 seconds to share the silver medal and to complete the Jamaican sweep. Together with Fraser, Stewart, Sheri-Ann Brooks, Aleen Bailey and Veronica Campbell-Brown she also took part in the 4 × 100 m relay. In their first round heat (without Simpson and Stewart) they placed first in front of Russia, Germany and China. Their time of 42.24 seconds was the first time overall out of sixteen participating nations. With this result they qualified for the final, in which they replaced Brooks and Bailey with Simpson and Stewart. Eventually they did not finish their race, due to a mistake in the baton exchange.

Brief suspension
On 14 July 2013, Simpson informed that a urine sample she supplied after competing in the Jamaican national championships in June 2013 had tested positive for the banned stimulant oxilofrine, along with Asafa Powell. On 10 April 2014, both athletes received an 18-month suspension from competing, which was set to expire in December that year. However, after appealing to the Court of Arbitration for Sport (CAS), both athletes' suspensions were lifted on 14 July 2014. CAS stated that: "They put forward that the offence committed was minor because it was caused by contamination of the food supplement Epiphany D1 by the banned substance oxilofrine and requested that the suspensions be reduced to three months."

Personal bests

References

External links

1984 births
Living people
People from Manchester Parish
Jamaican female sprinters
Athletes (track and field) at the 2004 Summer Olympics
Athletes (track and field) at the 2008 Summer Olympics
Athletes (track and field) at the 2012 Summer Olympics
Athletes (track and field) at the 2006 Commonwealth Games
Commonwealth Games gold medallists for Jamaica
Olympic athletes of Jamaica
Olympic gold medalists for Jamaica
Olympic silver medalists for Jamaica
Commonwealth Games medallists in athletics
World Athletics Championships medalists
Medalists at the 2012 Summer Olympics
Medalists at the 2008 Summer Olympics
Medalists at the 2004 Summer Olympics
Jamaican sportspeople in doping cases
Doping cases in athletics
Pan American Games gold medalists for Jamaica
Pan American Games medalists in athletics (track and field)
Athletes (track and field) at the 2015 Pan American Games
World Athletics Championships athletes for Jamaica
Olympic gold medalists in athletics (track and field)
Olympic silver medalists in athletics (track and field)
Competitors at the 2018 Central American and Caribbean Games
Central American and Caribbean Games gold medalists for Jamaica
World Athletics Championships winners
Central American and Caribbean Games medalists in athletics
Medalists at the 2015 Pan American Games
Olympic female sprinters
Medallists at the 2006 Commonwealth Games